Dead man's fingers or Dead men's fingers may refer to:

 Xylaria polymorpha, a species of ascomycetous fungus
 Decaisnea fargesii, deciduous shrub of the family Lardizabalaceae
 Alcyonium digitatum, a type of coral
 Codium fragile, a seaweed
 The gills of a crab
 The fruit of a Decaisnea
 Orchis mascula, an orchid with tubers that are sometimes finger-shaped
 Chalina, a demospongian poriferan may also be referred to as "dead man's finger"